The County of Moers was a historical princely territory on the left bank of the Lower Rhine that included the towns of Moers and Krefeld as well as the surrounding villages and regions.

History 

The House of Moers went extinct in 1578, after which the county was claimed by the House of Orange-Nassau as well as the Duchy of Cleves. On the extinction of Orange-Nassau in 1702, the County of Moers was acquired by the Kingdom of Prussia, and elevated to a principality on 6 May 1705. Although the county was legally dissolved as far back as 1797/1801, the names of communal institutions and local firms often incorporate the word Grafschafter ("comital") which harks back to the County of Moers.

Footnotes

References

Literature 
 Hermann Altgelt: Geschichte der Grafen und Herren von Moers. Düsseldorf, 1845.
 Karl Hirschberg: Historische Reise durch die Grafschaft Moers von der Römerzeit bis zur Jahrhundertwende, Verlag Steiger, Moers, 1975
 Gerhard Köbler: Historisches Lexikon der deutschen Länder. Die deutschen Territorien vom Mittelalter bis zur Gegenwart. Beck, Munich, 1995, .
 Theodor Joseph Lacomblet: Urkundenbuch für die Geschichte des Niederrheins oder des Erzstifts Cöln, der Fürstenthümer Jülich und Berg, Geldern, Meurs, Cleve und Mark, und der Reichsstifte Elten, Essen und Werden. From sources in the Royal Provincial Archives of Düsseldorf and in the Church and Municipal Archives of the Province, Vol. 4, J. Wolf, 1858.
 Guido Rotthoff: Zu den frühen Generationen der Herren und Grafen von Moers. In: Annalen des Historischen Vereins für den Niederrhein. (AnnHVNdrh) 200, 1997, pp. 9–22.
 Margret Wensky: Moers Die Geschichte der Stadt von der Frühzeit bis zur Gegenwart. In: Von der preußischen Zeit bis zur Gegenwart. 2. Band, 2000, Böhlau Verlag, Cologne, Weimar, Vienna. .

External links 

 Moers town history, short table
 Moers Municipal Archives
 nbn-resolving.de Digitalised edition of the History of the County of Moers (Geschichte der Grafschaft Moers) by Carl Hirschberg
 Comital Museum (Grafschafter Museum)

Moers
Moers
History of the Rhineland
!
Lower Rhenish-Westphalian Circle